Ernest Pointer (1872 – after 1900) was an English professional footballer who made 28 appearances in the Football League playing for Small Heath. He played as a goalkeeper.

Pointer was born in the Sparkbrook district of Birmingham. He began his football career with Redditch Town of the Birmingham & District League before joining Small Heath of the Football League Second Division in 1896. He made his debut on 12 September 1896 in a 4–3 defeat at Newcastle United, and kept his place throughout the 1896–97 season, at the end of which the club finished in fourth position. His erratic goalkeeping meant that was the only season he spent in the league team, and in 1898 he moved back to the Birmingham & District League with Worcester club Berwick Rangers. Returning to Small Heath two years later, he was unable to establish himself in the reserve team, let alone the first team, and soon dropped back to the Birmingham League again, this time with Kidderminster Harriers.

References

1872 births
Year of death missing
Footballers from Birmingham, West Midlands
English footballers
Association football goalkeepers
Redditch United F.C. players
Birmingham City F.C. players
Worcester City F.C. players
Kidderminster Harriers F.C. players
English Football League players
Date of birth missing
Place of death missing